The Egyptian hieroglyph for "perfect, complete" (with the extended meanings of "good, pleasant, well, beautiful") in Gardiner's sign list is numbered F35; its phonetic value is , with a reconstructed pronunciation of  and a conventional Egyptological vocalization of .

Hieroglyphs and symbolism
The triliteral Egyptian hieroglyph F35 ('nfr') has sometimes been explained as a representation of a lute; however, Egyptologists today no longer consider this hypothesis likely. Rather than a lute, the hieroglyph is actually a representation of the heart and trachea. It originally may have been the esophagus and heart. The striations of the windpipe only appear in the hieroglyph following the Old Kingdom of Egypt. The lower part of the sign has always clearly been the heart, for the markings clearly follow the form of a sheep's heart.

Use
The term  has been incorporated into many names in Ancient Egypt. Examples include Nefertiti, Nefertari, and Neferhotep.

Some scholars suggest that it was used in ancient Egyptian construction where 'nfrw' was used to denote 'level zero' of a building and in accounting where 'nfr' would refer to a zero balance.

Pharaoh
Nefer was an ancient Egyptian pharaoh who ruled for two years, one month, and a day, from 2197–2193 BCE, according to the Turin Canon, though he reigned during the reign of Pepi II Neferkare.

References

Ancient Egypt: the Mythology - Nefer (Beauty)

22nd-century BC Pharaohs
Beauty
Egyptian hieroglyphs
Egyptian words and phrases
Heart
Pharaohs of the Sixth Dynasty of Egypt
Sheep in art
Trachea
Year of birth missing
Year of death missing